Ramón Alfonseda Pous (born 4 March 1948) is a Spanish retired footballer. He competed in the men's tournament at the 1968 Summer Olympics.

References

External links
 

1948 births
Living people
Spanish footballers
Olympic footballers of Spain
Footballers at the 1968 Summer Olympics
Footballers from Granollers
Association football forwards
FC Barcelona players
CE Sabadell FC footballers
La Liga players
Elche CF players
Levante UD footballers
Segunda División players